The Interscholastic Hockey League (ISHL) is a high school sports league based in Houston, Texas, that also serves much of southeast Texas. It is composed of several ice hockey teams at the "Prep" (equivalent to "Junior Varsity" in most other high school sports) and "Varsity" levels. 

Founded in 1998, the league operates within a non-traditional hockey market, and though it experienced exponential growth in its first few seasons, development has remained stagnant in subsequent years.

High school ice hockey in the United States
High school sports associations in the United States
Ice hockey in Texas
Education in Texas
Organizations based in Houston